Corporate jargon, variously known as corporate speak, corporate lingo, business speak, business jargon, management speak, workplace jargon, corporatese or commercialese, is the jargon often used in large corporations, bureaucracies, and similar workplaces. The tone is associated with managers of large corporations, business management consultants, and occasionally government. Reference to such jargon is typically derogatory, implying the use of long, complicated, or obscure words, abbreviations, euphemisms, and acronyms. For that reason some of its forms may be considered as an argot. Some of these words may be actually new inventions, designed purely to fit the specialized meaning of a situation or even to "spin" negative situations as positive situations, for example, in the practice of greenwashing. Although it is pervasive in the education field, its use has been criticized as reflecting a sinister view of students as commodities and schools as retail outlets.

The use of corporate jargon is criticised for its lack of clarity as well as for its tedium, making meaning and intention opaque and understanding difficult. It is also criticized for not only enabling delusional thoughts, but allowing them to be seen as an asset in the workplace.

Marketing speak is a related label for wording styles used to promote a product or service to a wide audience by seeking to create the impression that the vendors of the service possess a high level of sophistication, skill, and technical knowledge. Such language is often used in marketing press releases, advertising copies, and prepared statements read by executives and politicians.

Examples 

Many corporate-jargon terms have straightforward meanings in other contexts (e.g., "leverage" in physics, or "picked up" with a well-defined meaning in finance), but are used more loosely in business speak. For example, a "deliverable" can become any "service or product".
The word "team" had specific meanings in agriculture and in sport before becoming a ubiquitous synonym for a "group" spanning one or more levels in a corporate organisation.

The phrases "going forward" or "moving forward" make a confident gesture towards the future, but are generally vague on timing, which usually means they can be removed from a sentence with little or no effect on its overall meaning.

Legal terms such as "Chapter 11" can be used: for example, Chapter 11, Title 11, United States Code is about US bankruptcy.

Some systems of corporate jargon recycle pop ethics with terms such as  "responsibility".

Corporate speak in non-English-speaking countries frequently contains borrowed English acronyms, words, and usages.

Jargon, like other manifestations of language, can change over time; and management fads may influence management-speak. Thus the much-maligned use of the term "empowerment"
may have peaked about 2004 before declining.

See also 
 Academese
 Buzzword bingo
 Corporate communication
 Corporate identity
 Corporate propaganda
 Headlinese
 Journalese
 Legalese
 Military terminology
 Officialese
 Weasel word

References

Further reading 
 , regarded as an authoritative guide to legal language, and aimed at the practicing lawyer.
 Maria Fraddosio, New ELS: English for Law Students (Naples, Edizioni Giuridiche Simone, 2008) is a course book for Italian University Students.
 BBCi (2006) "Workplace jargon isolates staff" 
 Reef Business Information (2006) "Managers unable to communicate with staff," Personnel Today

External links 
 Business Terms and Business Jargon explained
 Corporate gibberish generator
 Corporatepoems.com Corporate language rating
 Business Buzzword Generator
 Example of a generator of random plausible business-speak sentences
 Jargon Grader Database of over 700 corporate jargon terms
 Business English dictionary for corporate jargon

 
Business terms
Dialects of English